Spruchdichtung or Sangspruchdichtung is the German term for a genre of Middle High German sung verse. An individual work in this genre is called a Spruch (plural Sprüche), literally a "saying", and may consist of one or more strophes.

While closely associated with the lyric genre Minnesang, its theme is not love, but rather 
the Spruch treated predominantly of rational, didactic and pragmatic issues, including, for example, socio-political commentary, topics related to moral or religious teaching and philosophy, practical wisdom, biographical material, praise of patrons, begging and much else besides.

Where the texts offer general moral comment, they may also be considered gnomic poetry, while works directed at particular personages or issues are rather political poetry.

The most important medieval collection of Sprüche is the Jenaer Liederhandschrift (MS J), which also has a large number of Spruch melodies.

The Poets
The main poets working in this genre are:
 Spervogel
 Herger
 Walther von der Vogelweide 
 Bruder Wernher
 Der Marner
 Konrad von Würzburg
 Heinrich von Meißen (Frauenlob)
 Reinmar von Zweter

Notes

References
 
 

Middle High German literature
Musical terminology